Blaise Siwula is a New York City based free jazz musician and curator.

Blaise Siwula was born in Detroit, Michigan, on 02/19/1950. He moved to New York City in 1989 with his family, hoping to enter the music scene there. He has collaborated on recordings with many artists, including Cecil Taylor. He also curates the weekly C.O.M.A. music event as ABC No Rio.

Discography
 Projection: Zero
 Big Hearts
 The Slam Trio: In The Stillhouse
 Tandem Rivers (with Adam Lane)
 Joseph Scianni: One Eyed Jack
 Badlands
 Dialing Privileges
 Sound Scapes

References

1950 births
Living people
American jazz saxophonists
American male saxophonists
21st-century American saxophonists
21st-century American male musicians
American male jazz musicians